On 4 August 2019, a car drove into three other cars outside the National Cancer Institute Egypt in central Cairo, Egypt. The collisions caused an explosion, killing at least 20 people and injuring at least 47 others. The next day, Mahmoud Tawfik the Interior Minister of Egypt, said that the car contained explosives and was to be used in a terrorist operation. The explosives-filled car was on its way to commit an attack in another part of the capital. Tawfik accused the Hasm Movement of carrying out the bombing, but the group denied the allegations.

References

2019 in Egypt
2019 road incidents
2019 bombing
2010s road incidents in Africa
21st-century mass murder in Egypt
August 2019 crimes in Africa
August 2019 events in Egypt
Car and truck bombings in Egypt
Improvised explosive device bombings in 2019
2019
Mass murder in 2019
2019 bombing
Road incidents in Egypt
Terrorist incidents in Egypt in 2019
2019 murders in Egypt